Calophysus macropterus (also known as the Piracatinga, Vulture Catfish, or Zamurito) is a species of catfish (order Siluriformes) of the monotypic genus Calophysus of the family Pimelodidae.

This fish has also been placed in its own family, Calophysidae.

This species reaches  SL and originates from the Amazon and Orinoco basins. This species is reported to commonly attack the fishes caught in fishermen's nets and seines as well as those hooked on trotlines or gaffed.

This fish species is a smaller Pimelodid, and may be appropriate for a large aquarium. It is an adaptable and hardy species. Tankmates should be chosen with great care as this fish has the ability to bite and tear off pieces of flesh, although many who have actually kept the fish report no apparent signs of aggression.

References

 Ros, Wolfgang and Schmidt, Jakob (2008):  "Calophysus macropterus: Ein 'Hai' im Süßwasseraquarium", D. Aqu. u. Terr. Z. (Datz) 61 (4): 16-18.

Pimelodidae
Fish of South America
Fish of the Amazon basin
Taxa named by Hinrich Lichtenstein
Fish described in 1819